The men's 110 metre hurdles at the 2004 Summer Olympics as part of the athletics program were held at the Athens Olympic Stadium from August 24 to 27. Forty-seven athletes from 34 nations competed. The event was won by Liu Xiang of China, the nation's first medal in the event. Terrence Trammell and Anier García became the 11th and 12th men to win multiple medals in the 110 metres hurdles.

Summary

Ladji Doucouré was the leader in all of the preliminary rounds, but in the final, Liu Xiang led from the gun, running a flawless race to take the Olympic record and match Colin Jackson's world record with an identical 12.91. Behind him, returning silver medalist Terrence Trammell had a slight lead despite touching nearly every hurdle. As a result of these errors, Staņislavs Olijars appeared to edge ahead, but Olijars hit the sixth hurdle and slowed out of contention.  Coming back from an abysmal start, Doucouré became the next to edge ahead, looking like a lock for silver until he struck the final hurdle, leaving Doucouré to stumble across the finish in dead last. Trammell edged García to win his second successive silver.

Background

This was the 25th appearance of the event, which is one of 12 athletics events to have been held at every Summer Olympics. Five finalists from 2000 returned: gold medalist Anier García of Cuba, silver medalist Terrence Trammell and fourth-place finisher (and 1996 gold medalist) Allen Johnson of the United States, seventh-place finisher Dudley Dorival of Haiti, and eighth-place finisher Robert Kronberg of Sweden. Johnson had won the last two World Championships in 2001 and 2003 (along with the 1995 and 1997 worlds). But Liu Xiang of China, who had finished third at the 2003 worlds, had a strong first half of 2004 and was favored in Athens. World runner-up Terrence Trammell of the United States was also a challenger.

Croatia, Ecuador, Estonia, Georgia, Indonesia, Serbia and Montenegro, Slovenia, and Ukraine each made their first appearance in the event. The United States made its 24th appearance, most of any nation (having missed only the boycotted 1980 Games).

Qualification

The qualification period for Athletics was 1 January 2003 to 9 August 2004. For the men's 110 metres hurdles, each National Olympic Committee was permitted to enter up to three athletes that had run the race in 13.55 seconds or faster during the qualification period. The maximum number of athletes per nation had been set at 3 since the 1930 Olympic Congress. If an NOC had no athletes that qualified under that standard, one athlete that had run the race in 13.72 seconds or faster could be entered.

Competition format

The competition used the four-round format previously used in 1960 and since 1988, still using the eight-man semifinals and finals used since 1964. The "fastest loser" system, also introduced in 1964, was used in the first round.

The top four runners in each of the initial six heats automatically qualified for the second round. The next eight fastest runners from across the heats also qualified. Those 32 runners competed in 4 heats in the second round, with the top three runners from each heat and the four next fastest runners qualifying for the semifinals. There were two semifinal heats, and only the top four from each heat advanced to the final.

Records

, the existing World and Olympic records were as follows.

Liu Xiang equalled the world record in the final, setting a new Olympic and Asian record.

The following national records were established during the competition:

Schedule

All rounds were held on separate days for the first time since 1972.

All times are Greece Standard Time (UTC+2)

Results

Round 1

Qualification rule: The first four finishers in each heat (Q) plus the next eight fastest overall runners (q) qualified.

Heat 1

Heat 2

Heat 3

Heat 4

Heat 5

Heat 6

Quarterfinals

Qualification rule: The first three finishers in each heat (Q) plus the next four fastest overall runners (q) qualified.

Quarterfinal 1

Quarterfinal 2

Quarterfinal 3

Quarterfinal 4

Semifinals
Qualification rule: The first four finishers in each heat (Q) moved on to the final.

Semifinal 1

Semifinal 2

Final

References

External links
 IAAF Athens 2004 Olympic Coverage

M
Sprint hurdles at the Olympics
Men's events at the 2004 Summer Olympics